Conoesucidae is a family of caddisflies in the order Trichoptera. There are about 12 genera and more than 40 described species in Conoesucidae.

Genera
These 12 genera belong to the family Conoesucidae:

 Beraeoptera Mosely, 1953
 Coenoria Mosely, 1953
 Confluens Wise, 1962
 Conoesucus Mosely, 1936
 Costora Mosely, 1936
 Hampa Mosely, 1953
 Lingora Mosely, 1936
 Matasia Mosely, 1936
 Olinga McLachlan, 1894
 Periwinkla McFarlane, 1973
 Pycnocentria McLachlan, 1866
 Pycnocentrodes Tillyard, 1924

References

Further reading

 
 
 

Trichoptera